Qurayyat (also Qurayat, Quriyat) may refer to:
Qurayyat, Oman
Al Qurayyat, Jordan
Qurayyat Falhah, Jordan
Qurayyat Salim, Jordan
Qurayyat, Saudi Arabia

See also
Al-Qurayya